2001 Belarusian First League was the eleventh season of 2nd level football championship in Belarus. It started in April and ended in November 2001.

Team changes from 2000 season
Winners of last season (Molodechno) were promoted to Belarusian Premier League. They were replaced by the three teams that finished at the bottom of 2000 Belarusian Premier League table (Kommunalnik Slonim, Lida and Torpedo-Kadino Mogilev).

Four teams that finished at the bottom of 2000 season table (Traktor Minsk, Khimik Svetlogorsk, Veino-Dnepr and Polesye Kozenki) relegated to the Second League. They were replaced by two best teams of 2000 Second League (Darida Minsk Raion and Akadem-Slavia Minsk).

Luninets, who finished 2nd last season, disbanded during the off-season. Traktor Minsk were invited back to the First League to replace the team, but declined the offer. Khimik Svetlogorsk were invited instead and accepted invitation.

Before the start of the season, FC Rogachev changed their name to Rogachev-DUSSh-1, Svisloch-Krovlya Osipovichi to Svisloch Osipovichi and Akadem-Slavia Minsk were renamed to SKAF Minsk.

A week before the start of the season newly promoted SKAF Minsk withdrew back to the Second League, after their partnership with Slavia Mozyr (of whom they were previously a farm club) suddenly ended, along with the financial supply. No team was able to replace SKAF on a short notice and the league was reduced to 15 clubs for the season.

Teams and locations

League table

Top goalscorers

See also
2001 Belarusian Premier League
2000–01 Belarusian Cup
2001–02 Belarusian Cup

External links
RSSSF

Belarusian First League seasons
2
Belarus
Belarus